The official Transformers Hall of Fame was created by Hasbro to honor the most distinguished people behind the Transformers toy and entertainment franchise, along with some of the more popular Transformers characters. The Hall of Fame contains 32 characters and 22 humans as of April 2022.

Selection process 
Each year, Hasbro selects which individuals will be inducted into the human portion of the Hall of Fame. Hasbro also selects certain characters which it feels are deserving of enshrining in the Transformers portion of the Hall of Fame. For the purposes of the Hall of Fame, characters are not differentiated between the different continuities. Character biographies tend to reflect the characters are they are represented in Hasbro's current unified continuity.

Hasbro solicits additional nominations from various Transformers fan sites for the Fans' Choice Inductee. The top five nominees are eligible for election to the Hall of Fame, and voting takes place in April on the official Transformers website. The winner is announced at the Hall of Fame Induction Ceremony.

Induction ceremony 
The Hall of Fame Induction Ceremony occurs each year at BotCon, the official Transformers fan convention. The event is semi-formal, with inductees and presenters in formal attire, with attendees in business casual attire. In 2010, the ceremony was a dinner held at the Walt Disney World Swan and Dolphin Resorts and Convention Center in Lake Buena Vista, Florida. The 2011 ceremony was held at the Pasadena Convention Center in Pasadena, California.

Each human inductee is awarded a trophy, depicting Optimus Prime holding up the Matrix of Leadership, and is allowed to make an acceptance speech. Each character inducted, and each Fans' Choice finalist, is honored with a music video. (Erector was honored with a mockumentary, rather than a music video.) The Fans' Choice Inductee is revealed with a music video set to "The Touch."

Inductees

Human inductees

Character inductees

Fans' choice finalists

2010

2011

2012

2013

References 

Hall Of Fame
Toy halls of fame
Halls of fame in Rhode Island